The Yeshivah Gedolah of Chabad Lubavitch in Frankfurt am Main is a Yeshiva operated by Chabad of Germany; 
see Tomchei Tmimim.
The Director or Rosh Yeshivah is Rabbi Yossi Havlin; 
it was founded and continues to be run by Rabbi S. Zalman Gurevitch, Chabad Emissary to Frankfurt.

It is situated in the famous West-end Synagogue; the current bochurim (rabbinic students) come mainly from Israel and the United States. The Yeshivah Gedola was the first orthodox Yeshiva that was established in Germany after World War II
(see also Rabbinerseminar zu Berlin). 
In a certain sense it continues the tradition of what once Germany's largest yeshiva, Torah Lehranstalt, which was organized in Frankfurt by Solomon Breuer, son-in-law and successor of Rabbi Samson Raphael Hirsch.

A regular study day for the bochurim includes Talmud, Jewish law, Jewish philosophy,  and Jewish ethics; see . The bochurim are involved in the Chabad outreach programs in the Jewish Community, also in support to smaller Jewish Communities around Frankfurt.

References

Chabad in Europe
Orthodox yeshivas in Europe
Hasidic Judaism in Germany
Religious buildings and structures in Frankfurt
Education in Frankfurt
Jews and Judaism in Frankfurt
Chabad yeshivas
Yeshivas of Germany